Igumnov House is a historic house in Moscow, currently used as the residence of the French Ambassador to Russia. The house is located at 43 Bolshaya Yakimanka Street in the Yakimanka District of Moscow.

The building 
It is the oldest building occupied by the French embassy, facing Yakimanka Street (No. 43) - Igumnov House - was built in 18831893 to the design by Nikolay Pozdeyev (1855-1893), and cost the architect his life. Igumnov family acquired the lot in 1851; in 1880 Nikolay Igumnov hired Nikolay Pozdeyev to rebuild the old two-story empire style mansion into a larger residence. Pozdeyev, a graduate of Imperial Academy of Arts, already had five years of practice as the town architect of Yaroslavl, where Igumnov had substantial investments in textile mills. Halfway through the project, in 1888, architect and the client agreed to discard the existing structure altogether and redesign the building from scratch; its dimensions, as built, increased to 45×33 meters. After 13 years of slow progress the building attracted public attention and became a target of numerous art critics, detesting its pseudo-Russian luxury; whether for this reason or due to sheer greed, Igumnov refused to compensate cost overruns to Pozdeyev; the ruined architect committed suicide in October 1893.

After the October Revolution the nationalised building was taken over by a communal club, then by medical institutions. These included the Institute of Blood Transfusion established by Alexander Bogdanov in 1926. He lived there with his wife, Natalia Bogdanovna. Following his death, Natalia had Bogdanov's son move into her flat, the two of them remaining there until 1937.

The Embassy of France has occupied it continuously since 1938. A larger, modernist Embassy structure (No. 45) was built on an adjacent block in 1979; since that year, Igumnov House became an official residence of the ambassador. In August 2007 the management of GlavUpDK, the state organization in charge of embassy buildings, announced a forthcoming restoration of the building, estimated to cost 10 million US dollars. Igumnov House is open to visitors once a year, on the International Museum Day.

See also 
 France–Russia relations
 Diplomatic missions in Russia

References

External links 

  Embassy of France in Moscow

France–Russia relations
France–Soviet Union relations
Moscow
Ambassador residences in Moscow
Houses completed in 1893
France
Cultural heritage monuments of federal significance in Moscow